Absolute Steel is a Norwegian heavy metal band from Larvik. Formed in 1999, the band’s founding members were Andy Boss (lead guitar), Dave Bomb (lead guitar) and K2 (vocals). Throughout the late 1990s they played live performances and developed a heavy metal party band style that caught the attention of Edgerunner Records, a local heavy metal label. In 2002, the label released "The Fair Bitch Project", the band's debut recording. Performances after the release further defined their style by featuring female strippers and pyrotechnics.

A second Edgerunner release was planned, but the label folded before it could be issued. The recording was self produced and the band printed and distributed 200 copies in an attempt to attract another label. Black Lotus, a Greek label heard the recording and signed the band in 2005. Released as "WomaniZer", the recording was distributed worldwide and the label plans on remastering The Fair Bitch Project and releasing that as well.

Discography

Studio releases
The Fair Bitch Project, 2002
WomaniZer, 2004 (Re-issue 2005)

Demos
Absolute Steel Demo, 1999

Singles

We Sentence You To Death (Even If You're Innocent), 2001

Current line-up
K2 - vocals
Andy Boss - guitars
Dave Bomb - guitars
Dr. Schmutz - bass
Rick Hagan - drums

References

External links
Absolute Steel Official Homepage
Black Lotus records
Absolute Steel Encyclopaedia Metallum entry

Norwegian heavy metal musical groups
Musical groups established in 1999
1999 establishments in Norway
Musical quartets
Musical groups from Larvik